Communist Party of Andalusia (in Spanish: Partido Comunista de Andalucía) is the federation of the Communist Party of Spain (PCE) in Andalusia.

History
PCA was founded in 1979, as the Andalusian branch of PCE was converted into a regional party. The party supported autonomy for Andalusia, and called for a 'yes'-vote in the 1980 referendum on autonomy. During this phase it worked in cooperation with the Spanish Socialist Workers' Party at the municipal level. At the time, Fernando Soto was the general secretary of PCA.

PCA contested the 1982 Spanish parliamentary election, obtaining 211,456 votes (6.19% of the votes in Andalusia). The party was able to elect one parliamentarian to the Congress of Deputies, from the electoral district of Seville.

In the 1983 municipal elections, at a time when the influence of PCE was decreased across Spain, the Andalusian communists were able to win a decisive victory (57.4%) in the city of Córdoba. This was the sole provincial capital in which the PCE won the post of mayor in these elections. The electoral victory was largely due to the charismatic leadership of the mayoral candidate, Julio Anguita. The fourth congress of PCA, held in January 1984, decided to launch the coalition Convocatoria por Andalucía. Convocatoria por Andalucía would become a model for the statewide United Left (IU) which contested the 1986 municipal elections.

Leadership and organization
PCA is led by a Central Committee.

The tenth congress of PCA, held in Matalascañas March 20–21, 2010 elected José Manuel Mariscal as the new general secretary of PCA, replacing José Luis Centella (who had been elected as the general secretary of PCE in November 2009). Juan de Dios Villanueva was elected as vice general secretary.

The twelfth congress of PCA, held in Albolote July 2, 2017 elected Ernesto Alba as the new general secretary of PCA, replacing José Manuel Mariscal.

References

External links
PCA website

1979 establishments in Spain
Andalusia
Political parties established in 1979
Political parties in Andalusia